The 1966–67 Danish 1. division season was the 10th season of ice hockey in Denmark. Six teams participated in the league, and Gladsaxe SF won the championship.

Regular season

External links
Season on eliteprospects.com

Danish
1966 in Danish sport
1967 in Danish sport